The Principality of Sealand is an unrecognized micronation that claims HM Fort Roughs (also known as Roughs Tower), an offshore platform in the North Sea approximately  off the coast of Suffolk, as its territory. Roughs Tower is a Maunsell Sea Fort that was built by the British in international waters during World War II. Since 1967, the decommissioned Roughs Tower has been occupied and claimed as a sovereign state by the family and associates of Paddy Roy Bates. Bates seized Roughs Tower from a group of pirate radio broadcasters in 1967 with the intention of setting up his own station there. Sealand was invaded by mercenaries in 1978, but was able to repel the attack. Since 1987, when the United Kingdom extended its territorial waters to 12 nautical miles, the platform has been in British territory.

History 

In 1943, during World War II, HM Fort Roughs (sometimes called Roughs Tower) was constructed by the United Kingdom as one of the Maunsell Forts, primarily to defend the vital shipping lanes in nearby estuaries against German mine-laying aircraft. It consisted of a floating pontoon base with a superstructure of two hollow towers joined by a deck upon which other structures could be added. The fort was towed to a position above the Rough Sands sandbar, where its base was deliberately flooded to sink it on its final resting place. The facility was occupied by 150–300 Royal Navy personnel throughout World War II; the last full-time personnel left in 1956. The Maunsell Forts were decommissioned in the 1950s.

Occupation and establishment 
Roughs Tower was occupied in February and August 1965 by Jack Moore and his daughter Jane, squatting on behalf of the pirate station Wonderful Radio London.

On 2 September 1967, the fort was occupied by Major Paddy Roy Bates, a British citizen and pirate radio broadcaster, who ejected the competing group of pirate broadcasters. Bates intended to broadcast his pirate radio station – called Radio Essex – from the platform. Despite having the necessary equipment, he never began broadcasting. Bates declared the independence of Roughs Tower and deemed it the Principality of Sealand.

In 1968, British workmen entered what Bates claimed to be his territorial waters to service a navigational buoy near the platform. Michael Bates (son of Paddy Roy Bates) tried to scare the workmen off by firing warning shots from the former fort. As Bates was a British subject at the time, he was summoned to court in England on firearms charges following the incident. But as the court ruled that the platform (which Bates was now calling "Sealand") was outside British territorial limits, being beyond the then  limit of the country's waters, the case could not proceed.

In 1975, Bates introduced a constitution for Sealand, followed by a national flag, a national anthem, a currency and passports.

1978 attack and Sealand Rebel Government 
In August 1978, Alexander Achenbach, who described himself as the Prime Minister of Sealand, hired several German and Dutch mercenaries to lead an attack on Sealand while Bates and his wife were in Austria invited by Achenbach to discuss the sale of Sealand. Achenbach had disagreed with Bates over plans to turn Sealand into a luxury hotel and casino with fellow German and Dutch businessmen. They stormed the platform with speedboats, personal watercrafts and helicopters, and took Bates's son Michael hostage. Michael was able to retake Sealand and capture Achenbach and the mercenaries using weapons stashed on the platform. Achenbach, a German lawyer who held a Sealand passport, was charged with treason against Sealand, and was held unless he paid DM 75,000 (more than US$35,000 or £23,000). Germany then sent a diplomat from its London embassy to Sealand to negotiate for Achenbach's release. Roy Bates relented after several weeks of negotiations and subsequently claimed that the diplomat's visit constituted de facto recognition of Sealand by Germany.

Following the former's repatriation, Achenbach and Gernot Pütz proclaimed a government in exile, sometimes known as the Sealand Rebel Government or Sealandic Rebel Government, in Germany. In 1987, the United Kingdom extended its territorial waters to 12 nautical miles. Sealand now sits in waters internationally recognised as British.

Sealand sells "fantasy passports" (as termed by the Council of the European Union), which are not valid for international travel. In 1997, the Bates family revoked all Sealand passports, including those that they themselves had issued over the previous 22 years, due to the realisation that an international money laundering ring had appeared, using the sale of fake Sealand passports to finance drug trafficking and money laundering from Russia and Iraq. The ringleaders of the operation, based in Madrid but with ties to various groups in Germany, including the rebel Sealand Government in exile established by Achenbach after the attempted 1978 coup, had used fake Sealandic diplomatic passports and number plates. They were reported to have sold 4,000 fake Sealandic passports to Hong Kong citizens for an estimated $1,000 each. Michael Bates stated in late 2016 that Sealand was receiving hundreds of applications for passports every day. In 2015, Bates asserted that Sealand's population is "normally like two people".

2006 fire 

On the afternoon of 23 June 2006, the top platform of the Roughs Tower caught fire due to an electrical fault. A Royal Air Force rescue helicopter transferred one person to Ipswich Hospital, directly from the tower. The Harwich lifeboat stood by the Roughs Tower until a local fire tug extinguished the fire. All damage was repaired by November 2006.

Attempted sales 
In January 2007, The Pirate Bay, an online index of digital content of entertainment media and software founded by the Swedish think tank Piratbyrån, attempted to purchase Sealand after harsher copyright measures in Sweden forced them to look for a base of operations elsewhere. Between 2007 and 2010, Sealand was offered for sale through the Spanish estate company InmoNaranja, at an asking price of €750 million (£600 million, US$906 million).

Death of founder 
Roy Bates died at the age of 91 on 9 October 2012; he had been suffering from Alzheimer's disease for several years. His son Michael took over the operation of Sealand, although he continued to live in Suffolk, where he and his sons were operating a family fishing business called Fruits of the Sea. Joan Bates, Roy Bates's wife, died in an Essex nursing home at the age of 86 on 10 March 2016.

Recognition 
Simon Sellars of The Australian and Red Bull describe Sealand as the world's smallest country, but Sealand is not officially recognised by any established sovereign state. Nonetheless, the Sealand government claims it has been de facto recognised by Germany, as the latter once sent a diplomat to Sealand.

Legal status 

Sealand is now in British territorial waters. In the opinion of law academic John Gibson, there is little to no chance that Sealand would be recognized as a nation due to it being a man-made structure.

Administration 

Irrespective of its legal status, Sealand is managed by the Bates family as if it were a recognised sovereign entity and they are its hereditary royal rulers. Roy Bates styled himself as "Prince Roy" and his wife "Princess Joan". Their son had been referred to as the "Prince Regent" by the Bates family between 1999 and Roy's death in 2012. In this role, he apparently served as Sealand's acting "Head of State" and also its "Head of Government".

At a micronations conference hosted by the University of Sunderland in 2004, Sealand was represented by Michael Bates's son James. The facility is now occupied by one or more caretakers representing Michael Bates, who himself resides in Essex, England.

Sealand holds the Guinness World Record for "the smallest area to lay claim to nation status".

Business operations 
Sealand has been involved in several commercial operations, including the issuing of coins and postage stamps and the establishment of an offshore Internet hosting facility, or "data haven".

In 2000, worldwide publicity was created about Sealand following the establishment of a new entity called HavenCo, a data haven, which effectively took control of Roughs Tower itself. Ryan Lackey, Haven's co-founder and a key participant in the country, left HavenCo under acrimonious circumstances in 2002, citing disagreements with the Bates family over management of the company. The HavenCo website went offline in 2008.

Sports 

The Sealand National Football Association is an associate member of the Nouvelle Fédération-Board, a football sanctioning body for non-recognised states and states not members of FIFA. It administers the Sealand national football team. In 2004 the national team played its first international game against Åland Islands national football team, drawing 2–2.

In 2004, mountaineer Slader Oviatt carried the Sealandic flag to the top of Muztagh Ata. Also in 2007, Michael Martelle represented the Principality of Sealand in the World Cup of Kung Fu, held in Quebec City, Canada; bearing the designation of Athleta Principalitas Bellatorius (Principal Martial Arts Athlete and Champion), Martelle won two silver medals, becoming the first-ever Sealand athlete to appear on a world championship podium.

In 2008, Sealand hosted a skateboarding event with Church and East sponsored by Red Bull.

In 2009, Sealand announced the revival of the Sealand Football Association and their intention to compete in a future Viva World Cup. Scottish author Neil Forsyth was appointed as President of the Association. Sealand played the second game in their history against Chagos Islands on 5 May 2012, losing 3–1. The team included actor Ralf Little and former Bolton Wanderers defender Simon Charlton.

In 2009 and 2010, Sealand sent teams to play in various ultimate frisbee club tournaments in the United Kingdom, Ireland and the Netherlands. They came 11th at UK nationals in 2010.

On 22 May 2013, the mountaineer Kenton Cool placed a Sealand flag at the summit of Mount Everest.

In 2015, the runner Simon Messenger ran a half-marathon on Sealand as part of his "round the world in 80 runs" challenge.

Royal visited the platform before the swim, getting his passport stamped. He entered the water from the bosun's chair, signaling the start of the swim, and finished on Felixstowe beach. Royal was subsequently awarded a Sealand Knighthood by Michael Bates.

An American football team named the Sealand Seahawks were formed in 2021, announcing a game in Ireland against the South Dublin Panthers on 19 February 2022. The Seahawks won the game 42–13. In September 2022, The Seahawks took several teams to Montpellier, France to play against the France Royal Roosters, whereas a veteran team took on the Servals de Clermont-Ferrand.

References

Further reading 

 Cogliati-Bantz, Vincent. "My Platform, My State: the Principality of Sealand in International Law"  (2012) 18 (3) Journal of International Maritime Law 227–250
 Connelly, Charlie. Attention All Shipping: A Journey Round The Shipping Forecast, Abacus, 2005. .
 Conroy, Matthew. "Note: Sealand – The Next New Haven?" Suffolk Transnational Law Review, vol. 27, no. 1, pp. 127–152. Winter 2003. ISSN 1072-8546. Issue table of contents page .
 Fogle, Ben. Offshore: In Search of an Island of My Own, Penguin Books, 2007. .
 Garfinkel, Simson. "Welcome to Sealand. Now Bugger Off ". Wired. July 2000. Vol. 8.07.
 Gilmour, Kim. "Sealand: Wish You Were Here? " Internet Magazine. August 2002.
 Goldsmith, Jack, & Wu, Tim. Who Controls the Internet?: Illusions of a Borderless World, 2006, .
 Grimmelmann, James. "Sealand, HavenCo, and the Rule of Law" , March 2012, University of Illinois Law Review, Volume 2012, Number 2
 "License Plates of Sealand (Great Britain)". License plates of the world. Web. 28 December 2009.
 
 Menefee, Samuel Pyeatt. "Republics of the Reefs: Nation-Building on the Continental Shelf and in the World's Oceans". California Western International Law Journal, vol. 25, no. 1. Fall 1994.
 Miller, Marjorie, & Boudreaux, Richard. "A Nation for Friend and Faux". Los Angeles Times. 7 June 2000. p. A-1.
 Slapper, Gary. "How a law-less 'data haven' is using law to protect itself". The Times. 8 August 2000. p. 3.
 Strauss, Erwin S. How to Start Your Own Country, 2nd ed. Port Townsend, WA: Breakout Productions, 1984. .
 Taylor-Lehman, Dylan. Sealand: The True Story of the World's Most Stubborn Micronation and its Eccentric Royal Family, Diversion Books, 2020. .

External links 

 Official website
 Blueprint of the platform
 Sealand's official Tiktok account

 
Artificial islands of England
Geography of Suffolk
Micronations in England
North Sea
Separatism in the United Kingdom